McPherson Unit is a prison for women of the Arkansas Department of Correction, located in Newport, Arkansas, off Arkansas Highway 384,  east of central Newport. Established in 1998, the prison houses the state's death row for women.

The unit houses a campus of the Riverside Vocational Technical School.

Originally it was managed by the Wackenhut Corrections Corp. (now GEO Group), with the management contract beginning in July 1997. In 2001, after operating the McPherson Unit and the nearby Grimes Unit at losses, Wackenhut stated that it would not renew the contract.

Notable prisoners
Death Row
 Christina Marie Riggs – Executed May 2, 2000.

Non-Death Row
Leslie MacKool - Serving life without the possibility of parole.

References

External links

 McPherson Unit - Arkansas Department of Correction

Prisons in Arkansas
Buildings and structures in Jackson County, Arkansas
Capital punishment in Arkansas
1998 establishments in Arkansas
GEO Group
Newport, Arkansas